In ancient Celtic and Gallo-Roman religion, Cernunnos or Carnonos is a god depicted with antlers, seated cross-legged, and is associated with stags, horned serpents, dogs and  bulls. He is usually shown holding or wearing a torc and sometimes holding a bag of coins (or grain) and a cornucopia.  He is believed to have originally been a Proto-Celtic God. There are more than fifty depictions and inscriptions referring to him, mainly in the north-eastern region of Gaul.  Cernunnos is also associated with the Wiccan Horned God in the modern religious tradition of Wicca, via the discredited Witch-cult hypothesis.

Name and etymology
In Gaulish, the name Cernunnos is rooted in the word  which means "horn" or "antler".  Karnon is cognate with Latin  and Germanic , ultimately from Proto-Indo-European .
The etymon karn- "horn" appears in both Gaulish and Galatian branches of Continental Celtic. Hesychius of Alexandria glosses the Galatian word  (κάρνον) as "Gallic trumpet", that is, the Celtic military horn listed as the carnyx (κάρνυξ) by Eustathius of Thessalonica, who notes the instrument's animal-shaped bell. The root also appears in the names of Celtic polities, most prominent among them the Carnutes, meaning something like "the Horned Ones", and in several personal names found in inscriptions.

The Proto-Celtic form of the theonym is reconstructed as *Carno-on-os. The augmentative -on- is characteristic of theonyms, as in Maponos, Epona, Matronae, and Sirona. Maier (2010) states that the etymology of Cernunnos is unclear, but seems to be rooted in the Celtic word for "horn" or "antler" (as in Carnonos).

"Cernunnos" is believed by some Celticists to be an obscure epithet of a better attested Gaulish deity; perhaps the god described in the interpretatio Romana as Mercury or Dis Pater, which are considered to share Cernunnos's psychopomp or chthonic associations. The name has only appeared once with an image, when it was inscribed on the Nautae Parisiaci (the sailors of the Parisii, who were a tribe of Gauls). Otherwise, variations of the name Cernunnos has also been found in a Celtic inscription written in Greek characters at Montagnac, Hérault (as καρνονου, karnonou, in the dative case). A Gallo-Latin adjective carnuātus, "horned", is also found.

Epigraphic evidence
Due to the lack of surviving Gaulish literature regarding mythologies about Cernunnos, stories with various possible epithets he might have had, or information regarding religious practices and followers, his overall significance in Gaulish religious traditions is unknown.  Interpretations of his role within Gaulish culture vary from seeing him as a god of animals, nature and fertility to a god of travel, commerce and bi-directionality.  The only evidence that has survived are inscriptions found on various artifacts.

The Nautae Parisiaci monument was probably constructed by Gaulish sailors in 14 CE. It was discovered in 1710 within the foundations of the cathedral of Notre-Dame de Paris, site of ancient Lutetia, the civitas capital of the Celtic Parisii. It is now displayed in the Musée National du Moyen Age in Paris.  The distinctive stone pillar is an important monument of Gallo-Roman religion. Its low reliefs depict and label by name several Roman deities such as Jupiter, Vulcan, and Castor and Pollux, along with Gallic deities such as Esus, Smertrios, and Tarvos Trigaranus. The name Cernunnos can be read clearly on 18th century drawings of the inscriptions, but the initial letter has been obscured since, so that today only a reading "[_]ernunnos" can be verified.

Additional evidence is given by one inscription on a metal plaque from Steinsel-Rëlent in Luxembourg, in the territory of the Celtic Treveri. This inscription read Deo Ceruninco, "to the God Cerunincos", assumed to be the same deity. The Gaulish inscription from Montagnac reads αλλετ[ει]νος καρνονου αλ[ι]σο[ντ]εας (Alletinos [dedicated this] to Carnonos of Alisontea), with the last word possibly a place name based on Alisia, "service-tree" or "rock" (compare Alesia, Gaulish Alisiia).

Iconography

On the Pillar of the Boatmen, we find an image depicted with stag's antlers, both having torcs hanging from them with the inscription of "[C]ernunnos" with it.  The lower part of the relief is lost, but the dimensions suggest that the god was sitting cross-legged, in the depiction traditionally called "Buddhic posture", providing a direct parallel to the antlered figure on the Gundestrup cauldron.

Iconography associated with Cernunnos is often portrayed with a stag and the ram-horned serpent. Less frequently, there are bulls (at Rheims), dogs and rats. Because of the image of him on the Gundestrup Cauldron, some scholars describe Cernunnos as the Lord of the Animals or the Lord of Wild Things, and Miranda Green describes him as a "peaceful god of nature and fruitfulness" who seems to be seated in a manner that suggests traditional shamans who were often depicted surrounded by animals.  Other academics such as Ceisiwr Serith describes Cernunnos as a god of bi-directionality and mediator between opposites, seeing the animal symbolism in the artwork reflecting this idea.

The Pilier des nautes links him with sailors and with commerce, suggesting that he was also associated with material wealth as does the coin pouch from the Cernunnos of Rheims (Marne, Champagne, France)—in antiquity, Durocortorum, the civitas capital of the Remi tribe—and the stag vomiting coins from Niedercorn-Turbelslach (Luxembourg) in the lands of the Treveri. The god may have symbolized the fecundity of the stag-inhabited forest.

Other examples of Cernunnos imagery include a petroglyph in Val Camonica in Cisalpine Gaul. The antlered human figure has been dated as early as the 7th century BCE or as late as the 4th. Two goddesses with antlers appear at Besançon and Clermont-Ferrand, France. An antlered god appears on a relief in Cirencester, Britain dated to Roman times and appears depicted on a coin from Petersfield, Hampshire. An antlered child appears on a relief from Vendeuvres, flanked by serpents and holding a purse and a torc. The best known image appears on the Gundestrup cauldron found on Jutland, dating to the 1st century BCE, thought to depict Celtic subject matter though usually regarded as of Thracian workmanship.

Among the Celtiberians, horned or antlered figures of the Cernunnos type include a "Janus-like" god from Candelario (Salamanca) with two faces and two small horns; a horned god from the hills of Ríotinto (Huelva); and a possible representation of the deity Vestius Aloniecus near his altars in Lourizán (Pontevedra). The horns are taken to represent "aggressive power, genetic vigor and fecundity."

Divine representations of the Cernunnos type are exceptions to the often-expressed view that the Celts only began to picture their gods in human form after the Roman conquest of Gaul.
The Celtic "horned god", while well attested in iconography, cannot be identified in description of Celtic religion in Roman ethnography and does not appear to have been given any interpretatio romana, perhaps due to being too distinctive to be translatable into the Roman pantheon.
While Cernunnos was never assimilated, scholars have sometimes compared him functionally to Greek and Roman divine figures such as Mercury, Actaeon, specialized forms of Jupiter, and Dis Pater, the latter of whom Julius Caesar said was considered the ancestor of the Gauls.

Possible reflexes in Insular Celtic
There have been attempts to find the cern root in the name of Conall Cernach, the foster brother of the Irish hero Cuchulainn in the Ulster Cycle. In this line of interpretation, Cernach is taken as an epithet with a wide semantic field—"angular; victorious; prominent," though there is little evidence that the figures of Conall and Cernunnos are related.

A brief passage involving Conall in an eighth-century story entitled Táin Bó Fraích ("The Cattle Raid on Fraech") has been taken as evidence that Conall bore attributes of a "master of beasts." In this passage Conall Cernach is portrayed as a hero and mighty warrior who assists the protagonist Fraech in rescuing his wife and son, and reclaiming his cattle. The fort that Conall must penetrate is guarded by a mighty serpent. The supposed anti-climax of this tale is when the fearsome serpent, instead of attacking Conall, darts to Conall's waist and girdles him as a belt. Rather than killing the serpent, Conall allows it to live, and then proceeds to attack and rob the fort of its great treasures the serpent previously protected.

The figure of Conall Cernach is not associated with animals or forestry elsewhere; and the epithet "Cernach" has historically been explained as a description of Conall's impenetrable "horn-like" skin which protected him from injury.

Possible connection to Saint Ciarán

Some see the qualities of Cernunnos subsumed into the life of Saint Ciarán of Saighir, one of the Twelve Apostles of Ireland. When he was building his first tiny cell, as his hagiography goes, his first disciple and monk was a boar that had been rendered gentle by God. This was followed by a fox, a badger, a wolf and a stag.

Neopaganism and Wicca
Within Neopaganism, specifically the Wiccan tradition, The Horned God is a deity that is believed to be the consort of the Great Goddess and syncretizes various horned or antlered gods from various cultures.  The name Cernunnos became associated with the Wiccan Horned God through the adoption of the writings of Margaret Murray, an Egyptologist and folklorist of the early 20th century.  Murray, through her Witch-cult hypothesis, believed that the various horned deities found in Europe were expressions of a "proto-horned god" and in 1931 published her theory in "The God of the Witches".  Her work was considered highly controversial at the time, but was adopted by Gerald Gardner in his development of the religious movement of Wicca.

Within the Wiccan tradition, The Horned God reflects the seasons of the year in an annual cycle of life, death and rebirth and his imagery is a blend of the Gaulish god Cernunnos, the Greek god Pan, The Green Man motif, and various other horned spirit imagery.

In popular culture
Cernunnos is featured in both Marvel Comics and DC Comics as a member of the Celtic pantheon.
Cernunnos is a playable hunter as the second of the Celtic gods to arrive in Smite.
In the French production Black Spot Cernunnos is referred to frequently as the woodsman.

See also
 Abbots Bromley Horn Dance
 Celtic polytheism
 Celtic Reconstructionist Paganism
 Green Man
 Herne the Hunter
 Horned God

References
 Corpus Inscriptionum Latinarum (CIL) volume 13, number 03026
 Delmarre, Xavier (2003). Dictionnaire de la langue gauloise (2nd ed.). Paris: Editions Errance. .
 Lejeune, Michel (1995). Recueil des inscriptions gauloises (RIG) volume 1, Textes gallo-grecs. Paris: Editions du CNRS.
 Nussbaum, Alan J. (1986). Head and Horn in Indo-European. Berlin, New York: Walter de Gruyter. .
 Porkorny, Julius (1959). Indogermanisches etymologisches Wörterbuch. Berlin: Franke Verlag.

Notes

External links
 "Is the Gundestrup Cauldron an Authentic Celtic Artifact?": A possibly ancient depiction of the Horned God

Animal gods
Commerce gods
Fertility gods
Gaulish gods
Horned deities
Hunting gods
Nature gods
New religious movement deities
Wicca